Hugo (or Hugo the Hornet) is the mascot of the Charlotte Hornets of the National Basketball Association. Designed by Cheryl Henson, daughter of Jim Henson, Hugo the Hornet was created in 1988, one year before Hurricane Hugo hit the Carolinas. Hugo originally served as the Charlotte Hornets' mascot from 1988 to 2002, and was the mascot for the New Orleans Hornets from 2002 to 2013. When the New Orleans Hornets changed their name to the New Orleans Pelicans, Hugo once again became the mascot of the Charlotte Hornets.

History
The Hugo moniker was selected from a pool of more than 6,000 fan suggestions, and was inaugurated as part of the Charlotte Hornets' first season. In the aftermath of the damage resulting from Hurricane Hugo in September 1989, the Hornets announced that the Hugo moniker would remain, and the mascot's name would not be changed to Hoser or Hank.

During the break between the first and second quarters in a game between the New Orleans Hornets and the San Antonio Spurs, Hugo jumped off of a trampoline through a ring of fire, then dunked a basketball. Afterwards, the Smoothie King Center (which was known at the time as New Orleans Arena) crew responsible for cleaning up after the stunt used the wrong fire extinguisher and could not put out the fire. Eventually the arena filled with smoke, and the floor became covered with slippery chemicals which proved difficult to remove from the playing surface. It took a 19-minute delay to finally make the arena floor suitable for play again; NBA Executive Vice President of Basketball Operations Stu Jackson canceled the halftime show in response. Later, Jackson would fine the Hornets organization for the mishap. During the halftime show, Charles Barkley dared Hugo to do the act after the 3rd quarter, calling him gutless if he did not do it. Barkley continued calling out Hugo throughout the night and in the next game.

After the first Hornets franchise became the Pelicans in 2013, Hugo was retired in favor of Pierre the Pelican. Not long after, the Bobcats announced on December 21 that Hugo would be the mascot for the renamed Hornets in the 2014–15 season, replacing Rufus D. Lynx. Hugo officially returned to Charlotte on June 5, 2014.

Awards
Hugo is a 4-time winner of the NBA Mascot Slam Dunk Championship. Hugo is also a 2-time winner of the NBA Best Mascot Award by NBA Inside Stuff, a magazine that he has been featured in on numerous occasions. In addition, Hugo has also been featured in such foreign magazines as New Sports and 5 Majeur.

In other media
Hugo, as well as three other NBA mascots (Benny the Bull, Crunch the Wolf and The Suns Gorilla), appears as a hidden player in the video game NBA Jam Tournament Edition.

References

External links
 Hugo at NBA.com/Hornets

Charlotte Hornets
National Basketball Association mascots